Flutemazepam, initially first synthesized in 1965, but wasn't further developed and described until a team at Stabilimenti Chimici Farmaceutici Riuniti SpA in the mid 1970s. It is the fluorinated analogue of temazepam that has powerful hypnotic, sedative, amnesiac, anxiolytic, anticonvulsant and skeletal muscle relaxant properties. It is most closely related in structure to temazepam, being the fluoro instead of chloro analogue. As a result, flutemazepam has been shown to have similar pharmacological properties to temazepam and nimetazepam. It has been found to be effective for the treatment of the most severe states of anxiety, panic attacks, and severe insomnia. Furthermore, it is highly potent with 1 mg of flutemazepam being equivalent to 10 mg of diazepam. Flutemazepam is highly effective for acute psychotic states, especially stimulant psychosis, violent behaviour, and aggression.

It was first synthesized and described in 1965 by Leo Sternbach. In a test which compared a series of 3-fluorobenzodiazepine compounds in 1976, one of which was the 3-hydroxy benzodiazepine, flutemazepam. Of the tested compounds (9 different 3-fluorobenzodiazepines including, a powerful compound known as N-Desalkyl-3-hydroxyflurazepam). Flutemazepam was the most potent: 20x more potent than temazepam, 10x more potent than diazepam and nitrazepam, 5x more potent than nimetazepam and roughly equipotent to a related 3-hydroxy benzodiazepine, lorazepam. It was also the most rapid-acting compound of the series via oral administration, as well as the most active and powerful anxiolytic, myorelaxant, tranquilizer, motor-impairing, amnesic, sedative-hypnotic, and anti-convulsive agent at doses as low as 0.5-1 mg range.

See also 
Benzodiazepine
Nitemazepam - 7-nitro analogue of temazepam
Temazepam

References 

Benzodiazepines
Chloroarenes
Fluoroarenes
Lactams
Lactims
GABAA receptor positive allosteric modulators
Hydroxyketones